Cyclopia (named after the Greek mythology character cyclopes) is the most extreme form of holoprosencephaly and is a congenital disorder (birth defect) characterized by the failure of the embryonic prosencephalon to properly divide the orbits of the eye into two cavities. Its incidence is 1 in 16,000 in born animals and 1 in 200 in miscarried fetuses.

Signs and symptoms 
Typically, the nose is either missing or not functional. This deformity (called proboscis) forms above the center eye and is characteristic of a form of cyclopia called rhinencephaly or rhinocephaly. Most such embryos are either naturally miscarried or are stillborn upon delivery.

Although cyclopia is rare, several cyclopic human babies are preserved in medical museums (e.g. The Vrolik Museum, Amsterdam, Trivandrum Medical College).

Some extreme cases of cyclopia have been documented in farm animals (horses, sheep, pigs, and sometimes chickens). In such cases, the nose and mouth fail to form, or the nose grows from the roof of the mouth, obstructing airflow and resulting in suffocation shortly after birth.

Causes 
Genetic defects or toxins can misdirect the embryonic forebrain-dividing process. One highly teratogenic alkaloid toxin that can cause cyclopia is cyclopamine or 2-deoxyjervine, found in the plant Veratrum californicum (also known as corn lily or false hellebore). Grazing animals are most likely to ingest this plant and induce cyclopia in offspring. People sometimes accidentally ingest false hellebore while pregnant, thinking it is hellebore, an unrelated plant which does not even resemble false hellebore, being recommended as a "natural" treatment for vomiting, cramps, and poor circulation, three conditions which may be present in the early stages of pregnancy. Cyclopia occurs  when certain proteins are inappropriately expressed, causing the brain to stay whole, rather than developing two distinct hemispheres. This leads to the fetus having one optic lobe and one olfactory lobe, resulting in the eye and nose malformations of cyclopia.

The Sonic Hedgehog (SHH) gene regulator is involved in the separation of the single eye field into two bilateral fields. 
Although not proven, it is thought that SHH emitted from the prechordal plate suppresses Pax6, which causes the eye field to divide into two. If the SHH gene is mutated, the result is cyclopia, a single eye in the center of the face (Gilbert, 2000).

Notable cases 
 A British description from 1665 of a colt, that appeared to have cyclopia reads:First, That it had no sign of any Nose in the usual place, nor had it any, in any other place of the Head, unless the double Bagg CC that grew out of the midst of the forehead, were some rudiment of it. Next, That the two Eyes were united into one Double Eye which was placed just in the middle of the Brow.
 In October 1766, an infant in France was born with cyclopia, living for only a few hours. Reports of the case were made in the Mercure de France and an illustration of the infant was made by Marie Bihéron. The case was also mentioned in Volume IV of Buffon's L'Histoire Naturelle.
 On 1 March 1793, a 46-year-old woman in Boalts Torp, Glimåkra, Sweden gave birth to a child with cyclopia that died after two hours. The child was 35 cm long, its face without nose and nostrils, and its lidless eye with no eyebrow sat raised on the middle of its forehead like a large blueberry. The wrists were somewhat crooked as well as the right foot which was completely crooked and bent inwards. It was not clear whether it was a boy or a girl, but it was believed to be the former.
 On December 28, 2005, a kitten with cyclopia, "Cy", was born in Redmond, Oregon, United States and died about one day after birth.
 In 2006, a baby girl in India with cyclopia was born. Her only eye was in the center of her forehead. She did not have a nose and her brain did not separate into two separate hemispheres (holoprosencephaly). The child died one day after her birth.
 In 2011, an albino cyclops shark fetus was discovered in the body of a caught shark in Mexico, with no discernible nose and one giant eye. The unborn fetus was turned over for medical studies.
 On October 10, 2012, a small kitten was born. Its eye was in the center of the forehead and there was no developed nose to be found. The small cat died shortly after it was born. It was nicknamed Cleyed the Cyclops.
 On May 10, 2017, in Assam, India, a black goat was born with one eye and other cyclopia-related facial abnormalities. It was reported to still be alive over a week later, which is unusual for this condition.
On September 13, 2018, in Mandailing Natal, North Sumatera, Indonesia, a baby with cyclopia was born without a nose and one eye with the weight of 2.4 kg (5.3 lb) and heart rate under 100 bpm. The child died seven hours after birth.

Cultural significance 
The Islamic State of Iraq and the Levant used photos of babies born with cyclopia in its recruitment campaign. ISIL claimed the photos depicted Masih ad-Dajjal, who according to the Hadith, would have only one eye. Mainstream Islamic scholars consider the prophecy as referring to a one-eyed man, not a cyclops.

See also 
 Anophthalmia
 Cyclopes
 Hedgehog pathway

References

External links 

Congenital disorders
Absent body parts